Kevin Wolthausen (born December 27, 1957) is an American football coach and former linebacker. He is a defensive assistant at San Diego State University, a position he has held since 2020.

Coaching career
Wolthausen was hired as the defensive line coach for the Purdue Boilermakers football team on February 8, 2012. Wolthausen was relieved of his duties the following season, when head coach Danny Hope was fired.

Wolthausen was named the FIU Panthers Special teams coach on February 4, 2013.

On January 7, 2014, Wolthausen was named the defensive line coach and recruiting coordinator for the Connecticut Huskies football team under new head coach Bob Diaco. Wolthausen was shifted to linebackers and special teams coach in 2016.

On June 2, 2017, Wolthausen returned to Purdue as a quality control coach for new head coach Jeff Brohm.

References

External links
 San Diego State profile

1957 births
Living people
Arizona Rattlers coaches
Arizona Wildcats football coaches
Arizona State Sun Devils football coaches
Atlanta Falcons coaches
Cal State Northridge Matadors football coaches
Eastern Michigan Eagles football coaches
FIU Panthers football coaches
Humboldt State Lumberjacks football coaches
Humboldt State Lumberjacks football players
Las Vegas Locomotives coaches
Louisville Cardinals football coaches
Oklahoma Sooners football coaches
Purdue Boilermakers football coaches
UConn Huskies football coaches
USC Trojans football coaches
Sportspeople from Santa Barbara, California